The 1919 Marshall Thundering Herd football team represented Marshall University in the 1919 college football season.  In the first season resuming football after not fielding a team in 1918 due to World War I, Marshall posted an undefeated 8–0 record, outscoring its opposition 302–13.  Home games were played on a campus field called "Central Field" which is presently Campus Commons.

Schedule

References

Marshall
Marshall Thundering Herd football seasons
College football undefeated seasons
Marshall Thundering Herd football